American Insurance Company v. 356 Bales of Cotton, 26 U.S. (1 Pet.) 511 (1828), was a case decided by the Supreme Court of the United States. The case involved the validity of a local court established by Congress in the Florida Territory whose judges lacked life tenure, as mandated by Article III of the Constitution. Chief Justice John Marshall upheld the courts on the basis of Congress's broad power to enact local laws for territories under Article IV, Section 3, Clause 2 of the Constitution. The case was later discussed in Dred Scott v. Sandford, where Chief Justice Roger Taney distinguished it in holding that Congress could not ban slavery within a territory.

References

External links
 
 

1828 in United States case law
United States Supreme Court cases
United States Supreme Court cases of the Marshall Court
United States admiralty case law
Good Behavior Clause case law
United States Constitution Article Three case law
United States Constitution Article Four case law
United States in rem cases
Cotton industry in the United States
Florida Territory
Legal history of Florida
1828 in Florida Territory